The Capital Broadcasting Center (CBC) is a satellite television network in Egypt that began in July 2011. It is owned by the United Media Services.

The Network is owned by Mohamed Al Amin. It ranks second in Egypt in terms of viewership, according to Ipsos. It broadcasts entertainment, drama and general political programmes. CBC has been accused of pro-government bias.

See also
 Television in Egypt

References

External links

2011 establishments in Egypt
Television stations in Egypt
Television channels and stations established in 2011
2010s in Egyptian television
Arabic-language television stations